Saints Justa, Justina and Henedina (or Aenidina) of Cagliari (died 130) were Christian martyrs (possibly sisters) of Sardinia, put to death at Cagliari or possibly Sassari.

Their feast day is 14 May.

The town of Santa Giusta in Sardinia is named after Justa, and the cathedral is dedicated to her.

Sources
Saints and Angels: St. Justa
Saints.spqn: Justa, Justina and Henedina

Saints from Roman Italy
2nd-century Christian saints
People from Sardinia
Ante-Nicene Christian female saints